Willard Elmer White (December 7, 1849 – March 17, 1872) was an American professional baseball player. He served primarily as an outfielder but also as a catcher in 1871 with the Cleveland Forest Citys of the National Association. Although he broke his arm running into a fence during a game on June 22, he played 15 of Cleveland's 29 games in their inaugural season, batting .257. However, he died of tuberculosis in March 1872, becoming the first player from a professional baseball league to die.  White was the cousin of Deacon White and Will White.

Early life
Willard Elmer White was born in Caton, New York, on December 7, 1849. His parents were Benjamin and Minerva White, and he was the oldest of three children, along with sisters Ada (born sometime around 1852) and Ina (born sometime around 1862). Growing up, White played baseball with his cousin James (nicknamed Deacon), two years his senior. Though his parents thought he was squandering his time with the game, White had decided by the mid-1860s that he wanted baseball to be his occupation.

First years with the Cleveland Forest Citys
In 1868, White began playing for the Forest Citys, an amateur team in Cleveland, Ohio. Deacon played for them as well. The team folded after the season, but a new one was formed the next year that featured a mix of professional and amateur players. The Whites signed on with the new club, joining a roster that included Al Pratt and Art Allison. All these men were still with the team in 1871 when it became a founding member of the National Association, the first professional baseball league.

National Association (1871)
On May 4, 1871, White played in the first professional league baseball game in history, when the Forest Citys took on the Fort Wayne Kekiongas at the Kekionga Ball Grounds. Playing right field for the Forest Citys, White struck out three times against Bobby Mathews, who hurled a shutout in Fort Wayne's 2–0 victory.

Though White normally served as an outfielder, Charlie Pabor, Cleveland's manager, also had him catch three games. His season was interrupted on June 19, in a game he was catching against the New York Mutuals. A poor throw from an outfielder caused him to race to the edge of the playing field, and he broke his arm as he ran into a fence. The Forest Citys lost 10–6, and White was unable to play following the incident.

However, the injury did not end White's season. After missing 11 games, he was back playing for the ballclub on August 30, when Cleveland was defeated 12–10 by the Troy Haymakers. On the last day of the season, September 27, White recorded two hits in five at bats. He scored a run in the game and drove in two more, though Cleveland lost 9–7 to the Boston Red Stockings.

Despite the injury, White played more than half of the games on Cleveland's schedule (15 of 29). In 71 plate appearances (70 at bats), he batted .257 with 13 runs scored, 18 hits, two doubles, and nine runs batted in (RBI). He only struck out three times after the season's first game, but his total of six tied him with Al Reach and John McMullin for fifth in the league. White made seven errors defensively, and his .788 fielding percentage was below the league's .833 average.

Death
After the season, White was sure he would play for Cleveland again in 1872. However, he was diagnosed with tuberculosis over the offseason. At first, he was optimistic he would recover; Deacon remembered that he fought the "good fight." His condition continued to worsen, and he died of the disease on March 17, 1872, in Scio, New York, at the age of 22. With his decease, White became the first recorded professional league baseball player to die.

The whereabouts of White's burial have remained a mystery. According to baseball historian Frank Russo in his book The Cooperstown Chronicles, "There is some evidence that his body was brought back to his hometown of Caton for burial." Baseball-Reference.com states that White is buried at the Elmwood Cemetery in Caton, but Russo indicates that this has not been confirmed.

Relatives
White's cousin Deacon went on to play for 20 seasons and was elected into the Hall of Fame in 2013. Another of White's cousins, Will, was a pitcher for 10 years, winning 40 or more games in a season four times. The January 1889 issue of Sporting Life indicates that White was also related to Warren White, who played in the National Association from 1871 to 1875.

See also
 List of baseball players who died during their careers

References

External links

Major League Baseball right fielders
Cleveland Forest Citys (NABBP) players
Cleveland Forest Citys players
19th-century baseball players
1849 births
1872 deaths
People from Steuben County, New York
Baseball players from New York (state)
19th-century deaths from tuberculosis
Tuberculosis deaths in New York (state)